Periglossum  is a genus of flowering plants in the family Apocynaceae, first described as a genus in 1844. It is native to southern Africa.

Species
 Periglossum angustifolium DC. - South Africa
 Periglossum kassnerianum Schltr.  - South Africa
 Periglossum mackenii Harv. - South Africa
 Periglossum macrum Decne. - South Africa
 Periglossum mossambicense Schltr. - Mozambique

References

Asclepiadoideae
Taxa named by Joseph Decaisne